A wedding dress or bridal gown is the dress worn by the bride during a wedding ceremony. The color, style and ceremonial importance of the gown can depend on the religion and culture of the wedding participants. In Western cultures and Anglo-Saxon cultural spheres, the wedding dress is most commonly white, a fashion made popular by Queen Victoria when she married in 1840. In Eastern cultures, brides often choose red to symbolize auspiciousness.

Western culture

Weddings performed during and immediately following the Middle Ages were often more than just a union between two people. They could be a union between two families, two businesses or even two countries. Many weddings were more a matter of politics than love, particularly among the nobility and the higher social classes. Brides were therefore expected to dress in a manner that cast their families in the most favorable light and befitted their social status, for they were not representing only themselves during the ceremony. Brides from wealthy families often wore rich colors and exclusive fabrics. It was common to see them wearing bold colors and layers of furs, velvet and silk. Brides dressed in the height of current fashion, with the richest materials their families' money could buy. The poorest of brides wore their best church dress on their wedding day.  The amount and the price of material a wedding dress contained was a reflection of the bride's social standing and indicated the extent of the family's wealth to wedding guests.

Color of wedding dresses
The first documented instance of a princess who wore a white wedding dress for a royal wedding ceremony is that of Philippa of England, who wore a tunic with a cloak in white silk bordered with squirrel and ermine in 1406, when she married Eric of Pomerania. Mary, Queen of Scots, wore a white wedding dress in 1559 when she married her first husband, Francis, the Dauphin of France, because it was her favorite color, although white was then the color of mourning for French queens.

This was not a widespread trend, however: prior to the Victorian era, a bride was married in any color, black being popular in Finland.

White became a popular option in 1840, after the marriage of Queen Victoria to Albert of Saxe-Coburg and Gotha, when Victoria wore a white gown trimmed with Honiton lace. Illustrations of the wedding were widely published, and many brides opted for white in accordance with the Queen's choice.

Later, many people assumed that the color white was intended to symbolize virginity, though this was not the original intention: it was the color blue that was connected to purity, piety, faithfulness, and the Virgin Mary.

Even after white became the dominant color, for a period, wedding dresses were adapted to the styles of the day. In the early 1900s, clothing included a lot of decorations, such as lace or frills. This was also adopted in wedding dresses, where decorative frills and lace was common. For example, in the 1920s, they were typically short in the front with a longer train in the back and were worn with cloche-style wedding veils. This tendency to follow current fashions continued until the late 1960s, when it became popular to revert to long, full-skirted designs reminiscent of the Victorian era.

Since the middle of the 20th century, most Western wedding dresses are usually white, though "wedding white" includes shades such as eggshell, ecru and ivory.

White is not the universal color of wedding dresses. In Mexico, for example, red is a popular color.

In the Church of Jesus Christ of Latter-day Saints the color white is used as a symbol of purity, innocence, and cleanliness, particularly in religious ceremonies such as baptism and temple ceremonies, including weddings. For weddings in the temple, white clothing is also worn by all participants during the ceremony, both men and women, to also symbolize unity and equality before God. The bride's should be "white, modest in design and fabric, and free of elaborate ornamentation."

Current fashion

In the early 21st century many wedding dresses on the market are sleeveless and strapless. Other brides prefer  styles with sleeves, higher necklines, and covered backs.

Eastern culture

Many wedding dresses in China, India (wedding sari), Pakistan (heavily embroidered shalwar qameez or lehngas) are red; the traditional colour representing good luck and auspiciousness. Vietnam wedding dresses (in the traditional form of áo tấc the ancient Ao dai) were blue, dark blue.

Nowadays, many women choose other colours besides red. In modern mainland Chinese weddings, the bride may opt for Western dresses of any colour, and don a traditional costume for the wedding tea ceremony. 
In modern Taiwanese weddings, the bride generally picks red (following Chinese tradition) or white (more Western) silk for the wedding gown material, but most will wear the red traditional garment for their formal wedding banquets. Traditionally, the father of the bride is responsible for the wedding banquet hosted on the bride's side and the alcohol (specifically called "xi-jiu," confusingly the same as what the wedding banquet itself is called) consumed during both banquets. While the wedding itself is often based on the couple's choices, the wedding banquets are a symbolic gesture of "thanks" and appreciation, to those that have raised the bride and groom (such as grandparents and uncles) and those who will continue to be there to help the bride and groom in the future. Thus out of respect for the elders, wedding banquets are usually done formally and traditionally.

Red wedding saris are the traditional garment choice for brides in Indian culture. Sari fabric is also traditionally silk. Over time, colour options and fabric choices for Indian brides have expanded. Today fabrics like crepe, Georgette, charmeuse, and satin are used, and colors have been expanded to include gold, pink, orange, maroon, brown, and yellow as well. Indian brides in Western countries often wear the sari at the wedding ceremony and change into traditional Indian wear afterwards (lehnga, choli, etc.).

Traditionally, a Kurdish first-time bride would wear a red dress for her wedding to symbolize the postcoital bleeding she will experience when she loses her virginity while a Kurdish bride who used to be married before would wear pink. Today, many Kurds associate red wedding dresses with impoverished Kurdish rural society and it is no longer commonly worn.

A Japanese wedding usually involves a traditional pure white kimono for the formal ceremony, symbolizing purity and maidenhood. The bride may change into a red kimono for the events after the ceremony for good luck.

The Javanese people of Indonesia wear a kebaya, a traditional kind of blouse, along with batik.

In the Philippines, variations of the Baro't saya adapted to the white wedding tradition are considered to be wedding attire for women, along with the Barong Tagalog for men. Various tribes and Muslim Filipinos don other forms of traditional dress during their respective ceremonies.

Native American culture 

The indigenous peoples of the Americas have varying traditions related to weddings and thus wedding dresses.  A Hopi bride traditionally had her garments woven by the groom and any men in the village who wished to participate. The garments consisted of a large belt, two all-white wedding robes, a white wedding robe with red stripes at top and bottom, white buckskin leggings and moccasins, a string for tying the hair, and a reed mat in which to wrap the outfit. This outfit also served as a shroud, since these garments would be necessary for the trip through the underworld.

A Pueblo bride wore a cotton garment tied above the right shoulder, secured with a belt around the waist.

In the traditions of the Delaware, a bride wore a knee-length skirt of deerskin and a band of wampum beads around her forehead. Except for fine beads or shell necklaces, the body was bare from the waist up. If it was a winter wedding, she wore deerskin leggings and moccasins and a robe of turkey feathers. Her face was painted with white, red and yellow clay.

The tribes of Northern California (which include the Klamath, the Modoc and the Yurok) had a traditional bridal dress woven in symbolic colors: white for the east, blue for the south, yellow (orange) for the west; and black for the north. Turquoise and silver jewelry were worn by both the bride and the groom in addition to a silver concho belt. Jewelry was considered a shield against evils including hunger, poverty and bad luck.

Gallery

Historical Western European wedding dresses

Wedding dresses from different areas of the world

West Asian/North African dresses

East Asian dresses

South Asian dresses

Southeast Asian dresses

Modern Western-style dresses

See also

 Christian clothing
 Godey's Lady's Book
 Religious clothing
 Victorian fashion
 Wedding dress of Camilla Parker Bowles
 Wedding dress of Grace Kelly
 Wedding dress of Jacqueline Bouvier
 Wedding dress of Kate Middleton
 Wedding dress of Lady Diana Spencer
 Wedding dress of Meghan Markle
 Wedding dress of Princess Alexandra of Denmark
 Wedding dress of Princess Anne
 Wedding dress of Princess Elizabeth
 Wedding dress of Princess Margaret
 Wedding dress of Princess Mary of Teck
 Wedding dress of Queen Victoria
 Wedding dress of Sarah Ferguson
 Wedding dress of Sophie Rhys-Jones
 Wedding dress of Victoria, Princess Royal
 Wedding dress of Wallis Warfield

References

External links

Fashion Plates of Wedding Dresses from 1820-1929 from The Metropolitan Museum of Art Libraries
 Wedding Dresses at Chicago History Museum Digital Collections 
 Wedding dress, 1900, in the Staten Island Historical Society Online Collections Database
 Wedding dress, 1951, in the Staten Island Historical Society Online Collections Database

Wedding
Dresses
Gowns
Wedding dresses